Santa Marta, officially the Distrito Turístico, Cultural e Histórico de Santa Marta, is a city on the coast of the Caribbean Sea in northern Colombia. It is the capital of Magdalena Department and the fourth-largest urban city of the Caribbean Region of Colombia, after Barranquilla, Cartagena, and Soledad. Founded on July 29, 1525, by the Spanish conqueror Rodrigo de Bastidas, it was one of the first Spanish settlements in Colombia, its oldest surviving city, and second oldest in South America.  This city is situated on a bay by the same name and as such, it is a prime tourist destination in the Caribbean region.

History

Pre-Colombian times 

Before the arrival of Europeans, the South American continent was inhabited by a number of indigenous groups. Due to a combination of tropical weather, significant rainfall, and the destruction and misrepresentation of many records by Spanish conquistadors, our understanding of the peoples of this region is limited.

The Tairona formed mid- to large-size population centers, consisting of stone pathways, terraces, protected waterways, and spaces dedicated to agricultural produce. Their economy was primarily agricultural, cultivating corn, pineapple, yucca, and other local foodstuffs. The Tayrona are considered quite advanced for their time period. Surviving archaeological sites consisted of formed terraces and small scale underground stone channels. They also were known to actively collect and process salt, which was a significant trading commodity. We know that they traded with other indigenous groups along the coast and interior. Archaeological excavations have recovered significant works in pottery, stonework and gold.

Flag
Santa Marta's flag consists of two colors: white and blue. White symbolises peace, in that all are united without restriction. Blue symbolises the sky, the sea, the magic found in the horizon, and the snow-capped Sierra Nevada mountains.

Geography

Santa Marta is located on Santa Marta Bay of the Caribbean Sea in the province of Magdalena. It is 992 km from Bogotá and 93 km from Barranquilla. It is bordered to the north and west by the Caribbean and to the south by the municipalities of Aracataca and Ciénaga.

Climate 
Santa Marta experiences a hot semi-arid climate (Köppen BSh) with largely uniform temperatures year round. The dry season lasts from December to April, while the wet season lasts from May to November.

Economy
Santa Marta's economy is based on tourism, trade, port activities, fishing and agriculture, in that order. The main agricultural products are: bananas, coffee, cocoa and cassava.

Infrastructure 
Santa Marta is a major port. Historic figure Simon Bolivar died here, a significant event for South America as a whole. His villa known as La Quinta de San Pedro Alejandrino is located just outside the city centre. As the main city centre is located close to the coast, the city itself has had difficulty controlling expansion. Although, technically a separate locality, Rodadero is part of Santa Marta itself.

Gallery

Notable people
 Carlos Vives, singer of vallenato music
 Radamel Falcao, professional footballer
 Taliana Vargas, actress and model
 Alejandro Palacio, singer of vallenato music
 Sergio Díaz-Granados Guida, IDB Executive Director for Colombia and Peru
 Maria Claudia Lacouture, executive director of the Colombo American Chamber of Commerce
 Carlos Valderrama, professional footballer
 Andrés Solano, professional footballer
 Johan Vonlanthen, professional footballer
 Arturo Reyes, football coach
 Inés María Zabaraín, journalist

Media appearances
Santa Marta is the production location of the TV series The White Slave.

See also
 Taganga
 Ciudad Perdida
 Tayrona National Natural Park

References

External links 
  UNIMAGDALENA
  Bank of the Republic, economic history of Santa Marta
 
 
 

 
Capitals of Colombian departments
Municipalities of Magdalena Department
Populated places established in 1525
Port cities in the Caribbean
Ports and harbours of Colombia
Port cities in Colombia
1525 establishments in the Spanish Empire